Kharashah (also Romanized as Kharāshāh, Khorāshā, and Khorāshāh; also known as Khorāshān and Eslāmābād) is a village in Chahardeh Sankhvast Rural District, Jolgeh Sankhvast District, Jajrom County, North Khorasan Province, Iran. At the 2006 census, its population was 655, in 196 families.

References 

Populated places in Jajrom County